Cape Herlacher is a bold, ice-covered cape forming the north end of Martin Peninsula in Marie Byrd Land in Antarctica. Delineated from aerial photographs taken by U.S. Navy (USN) Operation Highjump in January 1947. Named by Advisory Committee on Antarctic Names (US-ACAN) in 1955 after Carl J. Herlacher, principal Antarctic cartographer with the U.S. Navy Hydrographic Office 1937.

References 

Herlacher